På spåret (On the Track) is a popular Swedish TV game show series broadcast on SVT since 5 September 1987. The show, which is intended to be humorous yet educational, has remained one of the most popular TV shows in Sweden, attracting an average of 2,150,000 viewers during the 2007 season. The all-time record was set in March 1990, when 3.7 million people tuned in to see the show. This means that nearly half of all Swedes saw the game show.

På spåret is an original format developed by Ingvar Oldsberg for SVT, and he hosted the show for many years. Lennart Dahlgren, winner of the first season, was the judge in 1988. Author and tennis legend Björn Hellberg was promoted from contestant to permanent Oldsberg sidekick and judge in 1995 after winning for four straight seasons. Famous gourmet, restaurant owner, and former contestant Carl-Jan Grankvist sat in for Hellberg during the 2004 season.

In 2009, after 21 years, Oldsberg and Hellberg left, and Kristian Luuk took over as host with Fredrik Lindström as judge.

Format
Two teams of well-known Swedes (during the initial seasons each team had three participants each, however this was later reduced to two) compete against each other. Participants are shown filmed journeys (usually filmed from the front of a train, but occasionally from a car, or even from a plane) and the objective is for each team to identify the destination of the journey, using visual clues from the video, and additional clues from the host. The clues, which often include puns and far-fetched word play, get progressively easier as the train approaches its destination, and the number of points awarded for a correct answer accordingly declines. After the journey both teams answer questions related to the destination city, and collect more points.

Each one-hour show has three filmed journeys, typically with one Swedish and two foreign destinations.

The journey involves the competitors figuring out the destination of a journey viewed at high speed from the driver's seat on a train (sometimes also a car, bus or boat) on the way to the place in question. The host reads out various tricky clues, as the journey progresses. Clues are awarded on 10, 8, 6, 4 and 2 points, and get progressively easier (2 points almost always includes a pun on the name of the destination). To answer, the team pulls the emergency brake; if the answer is correct, points are given corresponding to the level that the journey has reached. The other team must wait until the next point level to give their answer.

In between journeys 2 and 3, the original hosts, Oldsberg and Hellberg, used to read a text dressed up as Dr. Watson and Sherlock Holmes, giving progressively easier clues about a specific celebrity. The team that first identified the celebrity won points, or instead lost if the answer was wrong. Later "Holmes and Watson" was substituted by "Tintin and Captain Haddock". Following the 50th anniversary of SVT in 2006, this element was replaced by various mini-games, as follows:

'Return' (Swedish 'Retur') - the contestants must guess which is the correct year, based on films and pictures taken from SVT's archive. The correct answer gets three points while the wrong answer gives three minus points. Only the team that pulled the emergency brake first can answer. This section was added in connection with SVT's 50th anniversary.
Who's there? (Swedish 'Vem där?') replaced Return 2010/2011. Instead of a year, movies and pictures are clues linked to a famous person.
The List (Swedish 'Listan') was a new element from 2016/2017, replacing 'Vem Där?'. The team with the lowest score can choose between two subjects (for example, European capitals or Football players born in the 1970s). Both teams must then decide which four of the eight answer proposals belong to the chosen topic, and then lock their answers by pulling the brake. Three points go to the team that scores the four correct answers. If both teams answered correctly, it is the competitors who pull the 'brake' first who get the points. 'The list' disappeared after the 2018/2019 season (it did not seem very popular with viewers).
From the 2019/2020 season, the team that was behind after two journeys could choose between Who's there? and Return.
The 2021 season replaced Who's There? and Return with 'Nearest Wins' (Swedish 'Närmast Vinner'), where the team gets to see a film that connects to a place, somewhere in the world. The team that comes closest to marking the place on a blank map gets 3 points - like a geographical 'pin the tail on the donkey'.

Tournament
In recent years, each season have consisted of a tournament with three groups of three teams each. The winner of each group qualify for the semi finals; the fourth semi finalist is decided by a "quarter final" match between the two best teams that placed second in their respective groups.

Contestants
Until 1995 each team consisted of three people, since then the contestants have competed in pairs. The show typically feature intelligent, humorous and well-known celebrities, such as sports journalist Lotta Bromé, restaurateur Carl-Jan Grankvist, former weight-lifter Lennart "Hoa-Hoa" Dahlgren, comedians/TV-hosts Filip & Fredrik, Olympic high-jump champion Stefan Holm, and actor/TV personality Peter Harryson, sportsjournalist Johanna Frändén  to name a few.

Contestants 2007–08

Group 1
Caroline af Ugglas & Göran Hägg
Anne Lundberg & Johan Wester
Cecilia Hagen & Lennart Hoa-Hoa Dahlgren

Group 2
Ann-Marie Skarp & Jan Guillou
Filip Hammar & Fredrik Wikingsson
Kristina Kappelin & Kjell Bergqvist

Group 3
Pernilla Månsson Colt & Hans Mosesson
Karin Hübinette & Stefan Holm
Pia Conde & Thomas Petersson

Contestants 2008–09 

Group A
Fredrik Lindström & Peter Apelgren
Mari Jungstedt & Rickard Olsson
Lisa Syrén & Johan Wester

Group B
Zinat Pirzadeh & Göran Greider
Filip Hammar & Fredrik Wikingsson
Jessika Gedin & Hans Rosenfeldt

Group C
Tina Ahlin & Marcus Birro
Camilla Lundberg & Robert Aschberg
Siw Malmkvist & David Bexelius

Contestants 2009–10 

Group A
Alexandra Charles & Björn Ranelid
Hélène Benno & Peter Apelgren
Doreen Månsson & Hans Rosling

Group B
Jessika Gedin & Hans Rosenfeldt
Johanna Koljonen & Marcus Birro
Jessica Zandén & Philip Zandén

Group C
Vanna Rosenberg & Göran Rosenberg
Filip Hammar & Fredrik Wikingsson
Lena Sundström & Bo Sundström

Contestants 2012–13

Group A
Caroline af Ugglas & Göran Hägg
Johanna Koljonen & Marcus Birro
Ellinor Persson & Dick Harrison

Group B
Cecilia Hagen & Lennart "Hoa-Hoa" Dahlgren
Martina Haag & Erik Haag
Carina Lidbom & Tommy Engstrand

Group C
Lotta Bromé & Carl Jan Granqvist
Stefan Holm & Katarina Mazetti
Jessika Gedin & Hans Rosenfeldt

Contestants 2013–14

Group A
Eric Ericson & Kjell Wilhelmsen
Ann-Marie Skarp & Jan Guillou
Helena von Zweigbergk & Göran Everdahl

Group B
Martina Montelius & Dominika Peczynski
Morgan Larsson & Christer Lundberg
Ylva Hällen & Anna Charlotta Gunnarson

Group C
Martina Thun & Ulf Danielsson
Helen Alfredsson & Christian Olsson
Elisabet Höglund & Jesper Rönndahl

Contestants 2014–15 

Group A
Louise Epstein & Thomas Nordegren
Filip Hammar & Fredrik Wikingsson
Helena von Zweigbergk & Göran Everdahl

Group B
Jason Diakité & Lina Thomsgård
Gudrun Schyman & K. G. Hammar
Martina Thun & Ulf Danielsson

Group C
Eric Ericson & Kjell Wilhelmsen
Elisabet Höglund & Jesper Rönndahl
Jenny Strömstedt & Niklas Strömstedt

Past winners

Some of the participants have been celebrities in Sweden, more due to this show, than for anything they were before. This applies especially for the former weightlifter Lennart "Hoa-Hoa" Dahlgren. Although far from unknown before his first participation, his celebrity rose quite a lot due to his geographical knowledge. But also Björn Hellberg, Carl Jan Granqvist, Johanna Koljonen are included among the ones who perhaps are more associated with this television show than anything else, at the time and to the general public at least.

International adaptations
The format was sold to the Norwegian Broadcasting Corporation, where the show was called Jorda rundt (Around the World). It was canceled after only one season (1998–99).

References

External links
På spåret official site at Svt.se  

Sveriges Television original programming
Swedish game shows
2010 Kristallen winners
Rail transport in Sweden
Swedish-language television shows